Wiltz Joseph Bethancourt III (August 8, 1946 – August 28, 2014) was an American folk musician.

Biography
Bethancourt was born in El Paso, Texas, United States. He began learning banjo at age 9, after he heard his maternal grandfather, C. H. Burnett, playing fiddle. His first banjo was given him by his grandfather, and was "an old S.S. Stewart." This banjo is now in the able hands of his nephew, Tom Purtill.

When his family moved to Phoenix for the final time, in 1961, he began learning guitar, hanging around coffeehouses, mariachi bands, bluegrass groups, and a place called "J.D.'s," where he would sneak in to listen to such local artists as Waylon Jennings. With the "folk boom" of the '60s just hitting its stride, he found that all that music he had learned as a child stood in good stead.

His first "real pro" gig came at age 18. The Phoenix acoustic scene was active and thriving and Bethancourt associated with John Denver, the Irish Rovers and Jim Connor ("Grandma's Feather Bed"), and with some of the best in Dixieland, ragtime, and traditional Mexican musicians.

He spent a stint with a local bluegrass band, Ma Tucker's String Band, playing with Jeff Gylkinson (The Dillards) and Doug Haywood (keyboard player/songwriter for Jackson Browne). He also worked with noted entertainer Dan "Igor" Glenn in several bands. Bethancourt credited Igo with teaching him much about the entertainer's art.

In 1968–1969, Bethancourt worked in L.A. as a studio musician, where he made his first record, The Joe Bethancourt String Concert Album, which was favorably reviewed  by Billboard, receiving a four star rating.

Bethancourt returned to Phoenix, where he became influential in the original underground radio scene, hosting his own radio show on KDKB, Folk Music Occasional, with Bill Compton. He was also a regular on the Emmy award-winning Wallace and Ladmo Show on KPHO-TV (Ch.5) in the 1980s, and worked with children in the Arizona Commission for the Arts' "Artists in Education" program for about six years. He performed occasional artist residencies at local elementary schools throughout his life.

For almost 17 years, Bethancourt was the house band at Funny Fellows, a Phoenix restaurant, performing with his large collection of traditional and non-traditional instruments. During this time, he was instrumental in founding the Arizona chapter of the Society for Creative Anachronism (SCA). Bethancourt eventually left the organization, but retained his membership in the Dark Horde. His filk music within the SCA, under his Society name of "Master Ioseph of Locksley", is considered influential on the acoustic music scene in Phoenix, crediting him for much of their style and technique.

He played 65 different instruments; including banjos, 12-string guitar, cittern, Celtic harp, lute, and Ozark mouthbow.

Bethancourt was nominated for the Arizona Governor's Arts Award, and his recordings are now on file at the University of East Tennessee's Appalachian Archives Folklore collection. He was also on the advisory board of the Arizona Music and Entertainment Hall of Fame. Lynn Anderson called him "a genius" in the Summer 2007 issue of Western Way magazine.

He operated his own production company, White Tree Productions, and has recorded solo, with another noted songwriter, Leslie Fish, and with the neo-Celtic band The Bringers, all for Random Factors of Los Angeles. He taught acoustic instruments of all kinds out of Boogie Music in Phoenix, Arizona, and was active in an historical reenactment group, the 9th Memorial Cavalry.

On 30 March 2013, Bethancourt was inducted into the Arizona Music & Entertainment Hall of Fame.

He was based in Phoenix, Arizona.

Bethancourt died on August 28, 2014, after a long illness.

Discography
 That Great Big Way Out There (Random Factors)
 Who Fears The Devil? (Random Factors) (inspired by the "Silver John" stories of Manly Wade Wellman).
 Celtic Circle Dance (Random Factors)
 Naked Banjos (Random Factors)
 Ride Back in Time (Random Factors)
 It's About Time (The Bringers) (Random Factors)
 Our Fathers of Old (with Leslie Fish) (Random Factors)
 Serious Steel (with Leslie Fish) (Random Factors)
 Smoked Fish and Friends (RF-1004) (Random Factors)
 Arizona Road Song (White Tree Productions)
 Old Red Cat (White Tree Productions)
 The Black Book of Locksley (White Tree Productions)
 The Filk Was Great: The Best of ConterPoint 3; Gonglomeration Inc
 357 Miles East of L.A.  (Zia)
 CactusCon Choruses: NASFIC 1987 (WailSongs)
 This Train Is Bound for Glory (Carsten) 
 Arizona Sounds KDKB Vol. 1 (Dwight Karma)
 String Concert (Public) PS 5001

See also

References

External links
 official lyrics
 official lyrics at archive.org

1946 births
2014 deaths
Filkers
Folk musicians from Texas
Musicians from El Paso, Texas
American multi-instrumentalists